Lester K. Spence (born June 5, 1969), Professor of Political Science and Africana studies at Johns Hopkins University is known for his academic critiques of neoliberalism and his media commentary and research on race, urban politics, and police violence.  Previously, he was an Assistant Professor of Political Science at Washington University in St. Louis. Spence's writings on race and politics appear regularly in publications such as Jacobin, The Chronicle of Higher Education, Dissent NPR, New York Times, Baltimore City Paper, among others.  Spence also appears regularly on C-SPAN, The Marc Steiner Show, among others.

Raised in Inkster, Spence holds both a BA and a PhD in Political Science from the University of Michigan. He has lived in Baltimore since 2004 and is a father of five.

Publications
Spence, Lester. Knocking the Hustle: Against the Neoliberal Turn in Black Politics. Punctum Books, 2016.
Spence, Lester. "Race, Class, and the Neoliberal Scourge." Tikkun 28, no. 4 (2013): 29–31.
Spence, Lester K. "Race and The Green Mile." Contours of African American Politics: Black Politics and the Dynamics of Social Change 2 (2012): 281.
Spence, Lester, and Mike McGuire. "Occupy and the 99%." We are Many: Reflection of Movement Strategy From Occupation to Liberation AK Press (2012): 53–65.
Spence, Lester K. Stare in the darkness: The limits of hip-hop and Black politics. U of Minnesota Press, 2011.
Spence, Lester K., and Harwood McClerking. "Context, black empowerment, and African American political participation." American Politics Research 38, no. 5 (2010): 909–930.
Spence, Lester K. "Episodic frames, HIV/AIDS, and African American public opinion." Political Research Quarterly 63, no. 2 (2010): 257–268.
Spence, Lester K., Harwood K. McClerking, and Robert Brown. "Revisiting black incorporation and local political participation." Urban Affairs Review (2009).
Spence, Lester. "The Deaths Could Have Been Prevented." Space and Culture 9, no. 1 (2006): 5–6.

References

External links

1969 births
Living people
American political scientists
University of Michigan College of Literature, Science, and the Arts alumni
Johns Hopkins University faculty
Washington University in St. Louis faculty
21st-century African-American academics
21st-century American academics